Al-Mahawil  is a district in Babil Governorate, Iraq.  It is centred on the town of Al-Mahawil.

cities
 Al-Mahawil

Districts of Babil Governorate